Xu Liqun (born May 1959) is a former Chinese politician who spent most of his career in northwest China's Ningxia Hui Autonomous Region. He was investigated by China's top anti-graft agency in November 2020. Previously he served as secretary-general of Standing Committee of the People's Congress of Ningxia Hui Autonomous Region.

Biography
Xu was born in Pingluo County, Ningxia, in May 1959. At the end of the Cultural Revolution, he became a sent-down youth at Honghua People's Commune in the suburb of Yinchuan. In 1978, he was admitted to Baotou University of Iron Steel Technology (now Inner Mongolia University of Science & Technology), majoring in industrial and civil buildings. He joined the Chinese Communist Party (CCP) in December 1984.

After graduation in 1981, he was despatched to Yinchuan Real Estate Administration Bureau, where he was promoted to deputy director in October 1994 and to director in April 1999. He was appointed party secretary of Jinfeng District in November 2002, concurrently serving as secretary of the Party Working Committee of Yinchuan High Tech Industrial Development Zone. He was appointed vice mayor of Guyuan in August 2003 and was admitted to member of the standing committee of the CPC Guyuan Committee, the city's top authority. In June 2007, he was named acting mayor of Zhongwei, succeeding . He was installed as mayor in December. He was secretary-general of Standing Committee of the People's Congress of Ningxia Hui Autonomous Region in January 2018, and held that office until April 2021.

Downfall
In November 2020, he was placed under investigation by the Central Commission for Discipline Inspection (CCDI), the party's internal disciplinary body, and the National Supervisory Commission, the highest anti-corruption agency of China. 

On January 26, 2021, his qualification for delegate to the 12th Ningxia People's Congress was terminated. On April 27, he was expelled from the Communist Party and dismissed from public office. He was detained by Supreme People's Procuratorate on May 10. On August 31, he stood trial at the Intermediate People's Court of Wuzhong on charges of taking bribes. He allegedly took advantage of his position to benefit various companies and individuals on matters related to project contracting between 2005 and 2019. In return, he accepted money and gifts worth more than 6.95 million yuan (about 109 million U.S. dollars) and 10000 U.S. dollars. On November 19, he was sentenced to 11 years and 6 months and fined one million yuan on taking bribes and illegal possession of firearms. His illegal gains will be confiscated and his case transferred to the judiciary. Four vice mayors of Zhongwei, namely Yu Xia (2004–2009), Wang Xingde (2006–2007), Liu Zhonghu (2012–2013), Zuo Xinbo (2012–2016), were also sacked for graft.

References

1959 births
Living people
People from Pingluo County
Inner Mongolia University of Science and Technology alumni
Northwest University of Politics and Law alumni
Central Party School of the Chinese Communist Party alumni 
People's Republic of China politicians from Ningxia
Chinese Communist Party politicians from Ningxia